One Day It Will Please Us to Remember Even This is the third studio album by the American hard rock band New York Dolls. It was the group's first release of original material since their 1974 album Too Much Too Soon. The album was produced by Jack Douglas and written mostly by band members David Johansen and Sylvain Sylvain.

One Day It Will Please Us to Remember Even This was released by Roadrunner Records on July 24, 2006, in the United Kingdom and July 25 in the United States. It charted at number 129 on the U.S. Billboard 200 and received positive reviews from most critics.

Background 
At the behest of Morrissey, David Johansen, Sylvain Sylvain, and Arthur Kane reunited the Dolls to perform at the 2004 Meltdown Festival in London, with Steve Conte, Brian Delaney and Brian Koonin joining the band for the performance. Shortly after the show, Kane died due to undiagnosed leukemia, leaving Johansen and Sylvain as the only living original members. Sami Yaffa replaced Kane on bass when they returned to the studio for this album.

The title is a reference to Virgil's Aeneid, 1.203: forsan et haec olim meminisse iuvabit. Guest artists on the album include Michael Stipe, Laura Jane Grace, and Iggy Pop. A special limited edition version of the album was released with the bonus track "Seventeen" featuring blues musician Bo Diddley and a making-of-the-album DVD entitled On the Lip. The album cover was featured in the iPod nano 4th generation poster. Johansen said of the album, "It's a rock'n'roll record, and not a lot of people make rock'n'roll records today. They make weird marching music, or Hitler Youth rally music. Sheesh, there are some fucked-up records out there."

Critical reception 

One Day It Will Please Us to Remember Even This was met with generally positive reviews. At Metacritic, which assigns a normalised rating out of 100 to reviews from mainstream publications, the album received an average score of 75, based on 25 reviews.

Reviewing the album for Spin, Doug Brod hailed it as "a striking return to form" for the band, while Q magazine called it a "career highlight" in the group's discography. According to Dotmusic writer Jamie Gill, the album succeeded as a resolute "back to basics rock record" and weltering exploration of decadent rock and roll. Andrew Perry from The Observer felt it was the kind of boisterous, playful collection of songs "which, genuinely, nobody has the spirit or wit to put together these days". In the opinion of Rolling Stones David Fricke, the intense record reconciled the frenzied music of the band's early years with the matured formalism of David Johansen's 1978 self-titled solo album. AllMusic's Mark Deming believed the songs were philosophical, multisyllabic, and surprisingly intellectual for a group that was once decadent and fashionably punk. Writing in Blender, Robert Christgau deemed Johansen a "far more practiced and studied" songwriter, who "mourns mortality and celebrates contingency in the most searching lyrics of the year—lyrics deepened by how much fun the band is having"; he assigned it an "A+" grade in his "Consumer Guide" review.

Some reviewers expressed reservations. Pitchfork journalist Stuart Berman observed a less provocative style from the New York Dolls, writing that they sounded too humbled and restrained. Greg Kot of the Chicago Tribune said the band's new members lacked "personality", while NME magazine dismissed the new line-up as "an above-average pub-rock band". Charlotte Robinson from PopMatters was confounded by the songwriting and described the album as "an odd little number perched somewhere between being embarrassing Dolls-by-numbers and true to the original band's memory". Leonie Cooper of The Guardian found the "beefed-up production and Johansen's more gravelly voice" predictable, although he felt their songwriting had matured.

At the end of 2006, One Day It Will Please Us to Remember Even This appeared on several critics' lists of the year's best albums. It was voted the 43rd best record of the year in The Village Voices annual Pazz & Jop poll and was ranked 29th by The Observer, 27th by Mojo, 17th by Blender, 12th by Rolling Stone, 8th by Classic Rock, and 4th by Hits. Christgau named it his album of the year, and in 2009, he ranked it as the ninth best album of the 2000s decade.

Track listing

Personnel 
Credits are adapted from the album's liner notes.

New York Dolls 
 Steve Conte – guitar
 Brian Delaney – drums
 David Johansen – vocals, harmonica
 Brian Koonin – piano
 Sylvain Sylvain – guitar
 Sami Yaffa – bass

Additional personnel 
 Bo Diddley – guitar on "Seventeen"
 Colin Douglas – percussion, congas on "Dance Like a Monkey"
 Laura Jane Grace – vocals on "Punishing World" and "We're All In Love"
 Iggy Pop – vocals on "Gimme Luv and Turn on the Light"
 Andy Snitzer – saxophone on "Maimed Happiness"
 Michael Stipe – vocals on "Dancing on the Lip of a Volcano"

Production 
 Greg Calbi – mastering
 Sebastian Cotron – assistant engineering
 Blake Douglas – Pro Tools engineering
 Jack Douglas – mixing, production
 Jay Messina – engineering

Charts

References

Further reading

External links 
 
 

2006 albums
Albums produced by Jack Douglas (record producer)
New York Dolls albums
Roadrunner Records albums